Niels Carl Michaelius (Michael) Flindt Dahl, usually known as Carl Dahl, (24 March 1812 in Faaborg – 7 April 1865 in Frederiksberg) was a Danish marine painter during the Golden Age of Danish Painting.

Biography

In 1835, Dahl entered the Danish Academy where he ultimately specialized in marine painting under Christoffer Wilhelm Eckersberg who took him to Langelinie where he was able to paint frigates and liners in their natural environment. In addition to a study tour of Italy and the Mediterranean, he travelled to Lisbon (1840), Germany and France (1852 and 1855), Norway (1861) and to London and the Faroe Islands (1862). As a result of his interest in marine painting, he became one of Eckersberg's closest friends in the 1840s as they helped each other to complete their paintings.

In 1849, he won the Neuhausen prize for his  (Ships passing Kronborg). Despite his mastery of perspective, he lacked the freedom of artistic expression which would have contributed to the value of his paintings. His most important work is considered to be  (Battle at sea near Heligoland) now in Frederiksberg Museum.

Gallery

References

1812 births
1865 deaths
Danish marine artists
Royal Danish Academy of Fine Arts alumni
People from Faaborg-Midtfyn Municipality
19th-century Danish painters
Danish male painters
19th-century Danish male artists